The Akure Kingdom is a traditional state with headquarters in Akure, Ondo State, Nigeria. It is the successor to an ancient Yoruba city state of the same name. The ruler bears the title "Deji of Akure".

Location
Akure is located in southwestern Nigeria. The climate is hot and humid, influenced by rain-bearing southwest monsoon winds from the ocean and dry northwest winds from the Sahara Desert. The rainy season lasts from April to October, with rainfall of about 1524mm per year. Temperatures vary from 28 °C to 31 °C with mean annual relative humidity of about 80%.

Language
The people of Akure speak the Akure dialect of the Yoruba language. As one of the historic kingdoms of the Ekiti subgroup of the Yoruba people, the Akure dialect is considered by most Yoruba linguistic research to be a subdialect of the Ekiti Yoruba dialect.

Foundation
The region where Akure exists has been resided in for millenia; the Iwo Eleru skull was found in Isarun, a few miles from Akure town, and is evidence of ancient habitation. Thus, Akure as a settlement was founded before the arrival of Asodeboyede, likely around the time of the early Ife kingdom. Many small settlements, who were part of the early ancestors of the Ekiti people, were scattered where Akure is, including Upalefa, Igan, Odopetu, and Ileru. These settlements were autonomous and refused to be united as a single kingdom, as also happened in the early history of Ife. The ruler of Upalefa was Omoloju, who lived during the time of Omoremilekun, the founder of the Akure kingdom. 

Oral tradition of the Akure Kingdom begins with the uniting of these communities by the founding of a new royal dynasty in Akure. The Akure kingdom was founded by a prince named Omoremilekun, son of Ekun, and a descendant of Oduduwa Omoluwabi, the royal progenitor associated with the founding of the Yoruba people. Omoremilekun was a brave hunter of elephants. He was part of the migration of royal descendants from Ile-Ife to various parts of what is now Yorubaland. It is believed he was in search of a place to settle after passing a strict test administered by Oduduwa himself. This test wherein he was kept in solitude for about nine (9) days is still annually commemorated in Akure today by the reigning king of the town during a ceremony known as 'Oba wo ilesunta'. 

Omoremilekun was nicknamed "Aṣodẹboyèdé" (or The person who hunted and arrived with royalty), and like other descendants of Oduduwa in the Ekiti region, sought to annex and unite the various settlements who were already finding it difficult to agree among one another who was to be their leader. After defeating Omoloju and gaining the support of the indigenes, Asodeboyede was crowned the first Ajapada, or king, of Akure. The palace that was built to house him still stands and dates to 1150 AD, and was built equidistant between the three major settlements at the time. However, it is noted that Asodeboyede never wore royal beads, showing that a large portion of the early leadership of Akure refused to see him as the true ruler.  

It is not Asodeboyede that is believed to have derived the name Akure. Oral tradition states that when Omoloju, the ruler of one of the pre-Akure settlements, was clearing farmland, the string holding the heavy royal beads on the leader's neck is said to have snapped, thus causing the people to exclaim "Àkún rẹ" (or The beads have snapped), this later becoming the name of the settlement they established on the site. Omoloju was nicknamed Alakure (the one who owns Akure). Over time, the phrase was whittled down through its constant use to become Akure. This etymology was mainly popularized by Akure king Adesida I, but other older ones exist. Omoloju then reigned in his own authority as Alakure, and upon the death of Asodeboyede regained control of the Akure kingdom and ruled as Ajapada for 20 years. However, upon Alakure's death, all successive kings were descended from Asodeboyede.

The Akure Kingdom came to be known as one of the 16 or so kingdoms of the Ekiti people. It was considerably influenced by the Benin Kingdom, and Akure served as a trading link between Benin and Ife. Akure also has a connection with the Ekiti kingdom of Ikere, in which several Dejis are claimed to have had Ikere mothers.

Originally, the kings of Akure were referred to as Ajapada. The title Deji of Akure started with Oba Ogunja (r.1533-1554), whose father, Oba Olofinleyo (r. 1434-1474) took the daughter of Oba Atakunmosa, the Owa of Ijeshaland, as one of his wives while the latter was on his way to Benin. By the time Oba Atakumosa was returning to Ilesha from the pilgrimage, his daughter Omoba Owawejokun had given birth to a son. While other dignitaries gave the little baby common gifts, Oba Atakunmosa was said to have presented his grandson with a small diadem. Owafadeji (i.e. Owa gave him a diadem) became the praise name of the young boy, and by the time he reached his adulthood it had become his de facto name. When Owafa'Deji became Oba, the appellation assumed a titular importance and because of his prominence as an Oba, subsequent Obas or kings assumed the title while the advent of the modern era has formally made Deji the official title of the Obas of Akure. However, the original title of Ajapada has remained a significant part of the Deji's ceremonial style until the present day.

The Ado-Akure 
During its long history, the city-state of Akure was at times independent, at times subject to other states.
Due to this, there is now a sizable population of partial Bini descent within the kingdom. They are known as the Ado-Akure. Akure was the main base for Benin's trade in the area, and at times seems to have been considered within the western frontier of Benin.
The Ado-Akure were therefore originally something of a colony, and are said to be descended from Benin warriors and traders who took Akure brides upon settling in the kingdom. The Benin historian Egharevba, who was himself a part of the Ado-Akure community, refers to suppression of resistance by "rebellious Akure" during the reign of Oba Ewuare of Benin (1440–1473), although the Deji was allowed to remain as a nominal ruler. Another rebellion is recorded a century later during the reign of Oba Ehengbuda of Benin. In the 19th century, Osupa I, the son of the Akure king Arakale and a Benin princess, ascended the throne of Akure. He subsequently gave his fellow Ado-Akure land to settle and chieftaincies to hold.

Later history 

Akure had regained its independence by the early 19th century, but around 1818 it was recaptured by Benin forces and the Deji was executed. This set in motion a chain of events that culminated in the reign of Osupa I.
After 1854, Akure and other Ekiti towns came under the rule of Ibadan, which lasted until a rebellion in 1876 followed by a prolonged war between the Yoruba states.

Towards the end of the 19th century the British based on their Lagos Colony had established a protectorate over the area, although they ruled through "native" administrations.
The British sought to combine the Ekiti kingdoms of the region into a single administrative unit, against resistance by the Ekiti people who preferred local autonomy.
In 1899 Ekiti and Ilesha formed the northeastern division of the protectorate. In 1915, Ekiti, Owo and Ondo were combined to form the Ondo Province with headquarters at Akure.
Ondo Province later became part of Western State. In 1976 the old Ondo State was formed, and in 1996 Ekiti State was split off from the modern Ondo State, which has Akure as its capital.

The death in October 1999 of Oba Ataiyese Adebobajo Adesida IV led to a prolonged dispute over the succession, eventually resolved with the appointment of Oba Oluwadamilare Adesina in 2005.
Oba Oluwadamilare was dethroned on 10 June 2010 for sacrilegious misdeeds (wife beating) and Adebiyi Adegboye Adesida Afunbiowo II was chosen as the new Deji of Akure on 13 August 2010. His daughter, the Omoba Adetutu, was appointed princess regent following his demise on 30 November 2013.

Structure
Akure's King is known as the Deji of Akure and is supported by six high chiefs or iwarefa in his or her domain. The totem of Akure is the Leopard and the father of Omoremilekun Omoluabi was himself called Ekun (this was his regnal name). It is for this reason that every descendant of the Akure clan has been addressed by outsiders as Omo Ekun during the recitation of his or her praise poetry or, alternatively, as 'Omo Akure Oloyemekun', since Omoremi was said to have stayed for a while at Igbo Ooye before coming to the Akure region.

After the death or removal of an Oba, a princess regent is appointed under the title of Adele, who is expected to oversee the day-to-day administration of the kingdom while the kingmakers select the next Oba from one of the royal houses.

Although the Oba has relocated to a more modern palace, the old building from 1150 AD is still used for all ceremonies.
The place has over 15 courtyards, with each having its unique purpose. Ua nla, Ua Ibura, Ua jemifohun, Ua Ikomo are some of the names of the courtyards.
For example, in the Ua ubura courtyard, oaths are taken, and the ua Ikomo is used for naming ceremonies.

In addition to those of the Deji and the Adele, other titles are also borne by Akure royals. The titles of the Oloyes of the Omowas, the Eyesoruns, the Omobas and the Olooris are either bestowed by the Deji (in the cases of the former two) or acquired upon birth or marriage (in the cases of the latter two). The Oloyes of the Omowas are the titular chief princes and princesses of Akure. According to tradition, they are expected to serve as leaders within the royal families. The Eyesoruns, meanwhile, are the nominal leaders of the female royals. There is usually only one Eyesorun at any given time and she is traditionally either the reigning Deji's mother, step-mother or ceremonial surrogate mother in the first instance, or his senior wife in the second one (where the Deji is himself a polygamous male). The Omobas are the rank and file princes and princesses, any of the many members of the Omoremilekun Asodeboyede dynasty. Lastly, the Olooris are women that marry into the royal families. Their number would consist of a male Deji's wife or wives, the wives of the male Oloyes of the Omowas, and the wives of the male Omobas.

There are two other communities with their separate kings, cultures and traditions beside the Akure kingdom. The more prominent of the pair is Isinkan, while the second of them is Isolo. The ruler of Isinkan is known as the Iralepo while that of Isolo is known as the Osolo of Isolo. In the olden days, the three communities (Akure, Isinkan and Isolo) were located some distances apart. The war with the Benin empire in the pre-colonial period necessitated that the three communities move closer together however, and they have occupied their current positions ever since. Other nearby towns include Isarun, Ilara-Mokin, Igbara-Oke, Iju, Itaogbolu, Idanre, Owo, Ikere and Ondo.

Royal houses
Originally there was only one ruling house of Akure, Omoremilekun Asodeboyede, founded by the first king in the kingdom, Omoremilekun. The kingship passed down through an essentially ambilineal descent line (due to the fact that the kingdom had a few female monarchs) until the 29th king, Oba Arakale (r. 1768-1818), who had two sons, Oba Osupa and Oba Ojijigogun. These two kings are the progenitors of the cadet branches of the Asodeboyede ruling house, Osupa and Ojijigogun. The main royal family of the Osupa house is Odundun, whose progenitor is Oba Odundun, one of Osupa's sons and an ancestor of the current Deji of Akure, Oba Odundun II. The three royal families of the Ojijigogun ruling house are Arosoye, Adesida, and Ifaturoti, two of which were founded by ruling kings of Akure. Omoba Ifaturoti never became king, but his progeny is nevertheless recognized.

The Adesida family's reigning representatives were Adesida I, commonly called the Great (r. June 1897 - 1957), Ademuwagun Adesida (r. 1957–1973), Adelegan Adesida (r. 1975–1990), Adebobajo Adesida (r.  1990 - 1999) and Adebiyi Adegboye Adesida Afunbiowo II (r. 2010–2013). By the point when the Osupas were legally recognized in the early nineties, one Adesida or another had been ruling Akure for a little less than a century. As a result of this, the Adesidas ruled through some of Akure's most notable periods. These included Nigeria's independence in 1960, and the restoration of its democracy in 1999.

After the Adesida ruling family had ruled exclusively for many decades, descendants of Oba Odundun and Oba Osupa, such as Chief Olu Falae, petitioned the government to create a separate Osupa royal house for their descendants. This wish was granted with the legal recognition of the Osupa house in 1991. This also led to the removal of the omo-ori-ite rule, which stated that a prince or princess could only become monarch if they were born after their father or mother had become monarch. Because of this, grandchildren and great grandchildren of past rulers - in the male line - could now vie for the throne. This allowed Oba Osupa III, a supposed "great grandson" of Oba Osupa, to become king. Many claim that Oba Osupa lied about his relationship with the king and therefore bought his way to the throne. After he was deposed, another descendant of the Adesidas, Afunbiowo II, ruled for three years, before being succeeded by the current ruler Oba Odundun, a member of the Osupa ruling family.

List of Dejis and Adeles of Akure 

This is a list of the rulers of Akure since its founding in 1150 C.E. by Asodeboyede, a great-grandson of Oduduwa, who was the progenitor of the Yoruba race.

As will be seen, the longest reigning king of Akure was initially Oba Arakale, who ruled for 50 years (1768-1818). He was later surpassed by his grandson Oba Adesida I Afunbiowo, who ruled for 60 years and is the longest reigning Deji in all of Akure history:

References

Nigerian traditional states
Akure
Yoruba history